The Tropidoderinae are a sub-family of stick insects in the family Phasmatidae: genera are found in Africa, tropical Asia and Australasia.

Tribes and genera

Tribe Gigantophasmatini 
Authority: Hennemann & Conle, 2008
 Gigantophasma Sharp, 1898

Tribe Monandropterini 
Authority:  Brunner von Wattenwyl, 1893 - syn. : Monandropterae Brunner von Wattenwyl, 1893
 Heterophasma Redtenbacher, 1908
 Monandroptera Serville, 1838
 Rhaphiderus Serville, 1838

Tribe Tropidoderini 
Authority:  Brunner von Wattenwyl, 1893
 Lysicles (insect) Stål, 1877
 Malandania Sjöstedt, 1918
 Micropodacanthus Brock & Hasenpusch, 2007
 Parapodacanthus Brock, 2003
 Paratropidoderus Brock & Hasenpusch, 2007
 Podacanthus Gray, 1833
 Tropidoderus Gray, 1835
 Didymuria Kirby, 1904

References

External links
 
 

Phasmatidae
Phasmatodea subfamilies
Insects of Asia
Insects of Africa